Frederick Burchett (27 April 1824 – 16 July 1861) was an Australian cricketer. He played two first-class cricket matches for Victoria in 1858. he died in Melbourne at the age of 37.

See also
 List of Victoria first-class cricketers

References

1824 births
1861 deaths
Australian cricketers
Victoria cricketers
Cricketers from Greater London
Melbourne Cricket Club cricketers